Phyllonorycter loniceriphaga is a moth of the family Gracillariidae. It is known from Tajikistan.

The larvae feed on Lonicera korolkowii. They probably mine the leaves of their host plant.

References

loniceriphaga
Moths of Asia
Moths described in 1992